Köln is the fourth live album by the free jazz group Last Exit, released in 1990 by ITM Records.

Reception

In a review for AllMusic, John Dougan wrote: "Another live set from the 1986 tour, Köln could well be the best of the bunch... the record's release was postponed for a couple of years. But man, was it ever worth the wait. Open up and burn."

Writing for Trouser Press, Greg Kot stated: "Sharrock has said he first met Jackson on the way to the group's first concert a few days before, and the lack of rehearsal brings spontaneity, energy and a palpable tension to the group interaction. The nineteen minutes of 'Hard School' are as harrowing as they are unrelenting, with Brötzmann, goaded by Jackson, coming out screaming and later inciting Sharrock to join in the carnage."

In a 2005 review for All About Jazz, John Eyles commented: "It is incredible to think that these recordings were made some twenty years ago; this music has a timeless quality and its influence has been immense in the decades since it was recorded, on groups like Napalm Death, Naked City, Aufgehoben No Process, and others. Last Exit remains as in your face and impossible to ignore as ever."

Track listing

Personnel 
Last Exit
Peter Brötzmann – tenor saxophone, cover art
Ronald Shannon Jackson – drums, voice
Bill Laswell – Fender 6-string bass
Sonny Sharrock – guitar
Technical personnel
Last Exit – producer
Robert Musso – mixing
Howie Weinberg – mastering

Release history

References

External links 
 Köln at Bandcamp
 

1990 live albums
Last Exit (free jazz band) albums
Atavistic Records albums